David G. Argall, Ph.D. (born November 21, 1958) is a member of the Pennsylvania State Senate, elected in a special election on March 3, 2009 following the death of fellow Republican James J. Rhoades. He was elected a member of the Pennsylvania House of Representatives in 1984 and served as Republican Whip from 2004 to 2008. Argall lost the 17th Congressional District election in 2010 after challenging incumbent Congressman Tim Holden. Eisenhower Fellowships selected David Argall as a USA Fellow in 1998.

Early life, education and career
As an Eagle Scout, Argall earned a bachelor's degree in political science and international studies from Lycoming College and a master's degree in American studies at Penn State Harrisburg. In May 2006, he earned his Ph.D. in public administration from Penn State. Argall is a part-time instructor that has taught at various educational institutions including Lycoming College and Penn State Schuylkill. The name Argall is of Cornish origin.

Pennsylvania Legislature
Argall was Chairman of the House Appropriations Committee, a position that led him to being named to the 2003 "The Pennsylvania Report Power 75" list of influential figures in Pennsylvania politics. He was elected to serve as the Republican Whip in 2004 and again in 2006.

Argall did not run for re-election to the post of Minority Whip in order to run for the State Senate seat from the 29th district which was vacated by the death and posthumous re-election of Senator James Rhoades. He was elected to the seat over his Democratic opponent, Schuylkill County Clerk of Courts Steven Lukach, by a margin of 62% to 38%.

2010 U.S. Congressional campaign

On January 11, 2010, Argall announced his intention to challenge incumbent Democratic Congressman Tim Holden in the November elections. Argall's state senate district covered much of the eastern portion of the congressional district, including Holden's hometown of St. Clair.
On November 2, 2010, Argall's 95,000 votes weren't enough as he lost for the first time in his political career, falling to Holden's 118,486 votes.  He did not have to give up his state senate seat to run for Congress; Pennsylvania state senators serve staggered four-year terms, and Argall was not up for reelection until 2012.

References

External links
David G. Argall official Pennsylvania State Senate site
Senator Dave Argall official constituency site
Dave Argall for U.S. Congress official campaign site
 
Campaign contributions at OpenSecrets.org

1958 births
Living people
Lycoming College alumni
Pennsylvania State University alumni
People from Schuylkill County, Pennsylvania
Republican Party members of the Pennsylvania House of Representatives
Republican Party Pennsylvania state senators
People from West Chester, Pennsylvania
21st-century American politicians